A bridesmaid is a member of the bride's wedding party.

Bridesmaid may also refer to:

Film
The Bridesmaid (film), a film based on the Ruth Rendell novel
Bridesmaids (1989 film), a drama film starring Shelley Hack and Sela Ward
Bridesmaids (2011 film), a comedy film starring Kristen Wiig and Maya Rudolph

Literature
 The Bridesmaid, a novel by Ruth Rendell

Music
 Bridesmaid (band), a stoner rock band from Columbus, Ohio